Silvano Chesani (born 17 July 1988) is an Italian high jumper.

Biography
In his career he participated in two editions of the World Athletics Championships and won two national championship. In 2012 he jumped 2.31, his personal best, obtaining the qualification standard for 2012 Summer Olympics. In 2007 he was warned after testing positive for Formoterol.

In the indoor sean 2013, at the 2013 Italian Athletics Indoor Championships equals the Italian record in the high jump, 24-year-old was in fact the former was established by Marcello Benvenuti in 1989.

National records
 High jump indoor: 2.33 ( Ancona, 17 February 2013) - Current holder

Progression
Outdoor

Indoor

Achievements

National titles
Italian Athletics Championships
High jump: 2011
Italian Athletics Indoor Championships
High jump: 2012, 2013

See also
 Italian records in athletics
 Men's high jump Italian record progression
 Italian all-time top lists - High jump

References

External links
 

1988 births
Living people
Sportspeople from Trento
Italian male high jumpers
Athletics competitors of Fiamme Oro
Doping cases in athletics
Italian sportspeople in doping cases
Athletes (track and field) at the 2016 Summer Olympics
Olympic athletes of Italy
Mediterranean Games silver medalists for Italy
Athletes (track and field) at the 2013 Mediterranean Games
World Athletics Championships athletes for Italy
Mediterranean Games medalists in athletics
20th-century Italian people
21st-century Italian people